SEED Alternative School is a small Toronto District School Board alternative high school now located in Toronto's east end.

Previous locations include Yonge and College, McCaul St, and Bloor and Spadina, in downtown Toronto. Originally, as a summer program, it was at Dundas St West and Bloor St W (where they cross in Toronto, not in then-Etobicoke).

The acronym 'SEED' originally stood for 'Summer of Experience Exploration and Discovery', and when it became year round semestered school it was changed to 'Shared Experience Exploration and Discovery'. Students interested in a particular subject, would gather other students, and together they would find a knowledgeable person to act as a teacher or catalyst, and meet regularly to learn. The groups met at various locations and times, including sometimes evenings and weekends. It was entirely up to the students how many and which subjects they studied, and when and where the groups would meet. A group studying Mass Media, for example, would meet in the evening in the Lowther Avenue home of CBC Radio Broadcasters Betty Tomlinson and Allan Anderson. The Vegan Lifestyles cooking course met and cooked in student homes with parents joining to eat the meals prepared by the students. A Japanese Studies group met at the University of Toronto. A few groups met at SEED's own facilities.

SEED was founded by the then Toronto Board of Education as a summer program for high school age students in 1968 during the Pierre Trudeau era, a period that also produced Rochdale College and Theatre Passe Muraille and fostered the growth of Coach House Books and a number of other experimental institutions in Toronto. (SEED was not connected with any of them.) The teachers, or co-ordinators as they were called, in the beginning were Les Birmingham and Murray Shukyn, both of whom came from the elementary school system.

While initially a summer only program, the students of the second summer wanted to keep SEED going throughout the year. That fall the students obtained recognition from the University of Toronto, and requested the Board establish it as a high school to obtain core funding (for staff and space) and so that students could obtain high school diplomas. During that fall and winter, students ran SEED without any coordinators, using an office made available free by St Thomas Anglican Church on Huron Street.

The Board of Education agreed to make SEED a high school, and in September it was a recognized high school, operating in rented space at what was then the YMHA (at Bloor St W and Spadina) in Toronto. Official enrolment was capped at 100 students, with those 100 eligible to earn high school credits/diplomas. Additional students could also attend but not earn high school credits/diplomas. Grades 9 to 13 were included. Students who had gone to SEED but who were officially under the jurisdiction of a nearby Boards of Education, were included as students. A budget of about $200,000 was approved. Murray Shukyn was the first coordinator. To meet the technical requirement of having a principal, and yet minimize costs, the Superintendent of Secondary Schools A. L. Milloy was appointed Principal, but he was not involved at the school. A small core group of four or five teachers was hired, most of whom were certified to teach in more than one high school subject so that students, if they wished, could still take traditional subjects taught by certified teachers that would qualify for a high school diploma.

The students ran the school, often dealing directly with the Board of Education where trustees such as long time trustees Fiona Nelson and Dr. Maurice Lister were supportive.

At the time all Ontario high schools, with one exception, followed part B of the Ministry of Education's regulation HS1. Part B outlined the traditional high school program. SEED was only the second school in the province set up under part A. Part A allowed tremendous flexibility.

It was now possible to get a high school diploma using many different subjects.

The school was influenced by the pedagogical philosophy of A.S. Neill's Summerhill School. It was also known for its catalyst system in which university students, professors, community members and experts-at-large on a variety of fields facilitated classes. Milton van der veen was the catalyst for the SEED newsletter (he is now a volunteer with the charity 'Sleeping Children Around the World'.) Noted late science fiction author Judith Merril ran a weekly science fiction seminar at SEED from 1972–1973. Other notable catalysts included noted social activist June Callwood, CBC Radio broadcaster Allan Anderson, then-architect Colin Vaughan, journalists John Gault and Maggie Siggins, advertising executive Billy Edwards (one of the subjects of Allan King's film A Married Couple), and notable Toronto City Alderman Ying Hope. Several U of T professors, such as Milt Wilson of Trinity College, also taught courses. Notable faculty included poet and visual artist Luciano Iacobelli.

The notable impact of SEED, Toronto's first alternative school in the Toronto District School Board system, was that it opened the door to a number of other alternative schools. Among them were  Learnxs, Subway Academy One, SOLE, and ACE, which Murray Shukyn, SEED's co-founder and first coordinator, helped to organize.

A notable achievement was a short film entitled Life Times Nine made by SEED students that was nominated for an Academy Award in 1973.

Notable alumni include blogger, journalist, activist and science fiction author Cory Doctorow; former head of the Ontario Securities Commission and V.P. of the Toronto Stock Exchange, lawyer Edward Waitzer; musician and producer Efrim Menuck; Harvard physics professor and Chair of the Physics Department Melissa Franklin, a co-discover of the top quark; Denina Simmons Canada Research Chair in Aquatic Environmental Biology; visual artists Eli Langer and Michael Lewis; author Claudia Casper; gh3 principal and award-winning landscape architect, Diana Gerrard; intersex activist, researcher and professor of sociology at Wilfrid Laurier University, Morgan Holmes; professor of psychology at Conestoga College, Barry Cull; and photographer Michael McLuhan, son of Marshall McLuhan, notable artist Jesse B. Harris.

References

Further reading
 Shukyn, Murray, and Shukyn, Beverly. You can't take a bathtub on the subway: A personal history of S.E.E.D. Toronto: Holt, Rinehart & Winston, 1973.

External links
TDSB produced website
SEED produced website
Student-produced website - Archived from the original on Jan. 10, 2010
 Former school catalyst Judith Merril

Educational institutions established in 1968
High schools in Toronto
Schools in the TDSB
1968 establishments in Ontario